Harakiri, or Madame Butterfly, is a 1919 silent film directed in Germany by Fritz Lang. It was one of the first Japanese-themed films depicting Japanese culture. The film was originally released in the United States and other countries as Madame Butterfly because of the source material on which it is based and which also inspired Giacomo Puccini's eponymous 1904 opera. The film starred Lil Dagover as O-Take-san.

Synopsis
Nagasaki, Japan at the turn of the 20th century. Daimyō Tokujawa comes back to Japan after being an ambassador in Europe. A Buddhist monk wants Tokujawa's daughter O-Take-San to become a priestess of Buddha. In order to have her at his mercy, the monk sends the mikado a letter accusing the daimyo of conspiring against him. As a result, the mikado sends the daimyo a sword with which he commits suicide. The monk abducts O-Take-San but one of the Temple's servants let her escape and sends her to a tea-house where she becomes a geisha. A Danish naval officer, Olaf Anderson falls in love with her and marries her for 999 days, in accordance with Japanese custom. Shortly afterwards, Olaf Anderson goes back to his country and O-Take-San gives birth to his son. She refuses proposals to be married to Prince Matahari because she considers herself still married to Olaf. After four years, when her marriage with Olaf has expired and her son is going to be taken by the state, Olaf comes back to Nagasaki. He is now married and when his wife learns about O-Take-San's story, she goes to see her to say that she is willing to take care of her son. O-Take-San is desperate to see that Olaf has not even come to see her and answers that she will give her son only to Olaf in person. While Olaf's wife tries to convince him to come to O-Take-San's house, O-Take-San commits harakiri with her father's sword.

References

External links
 

 

1919 films
German black-and-white films
Films based on short fiction
Films directed by Fritz Lang
Films of the Weimar Republic
Films set in Japan
Films set in the 1890s
German silent feature films
Films about interracial romance
German historical drama films
1910s historical drama films
Films produced by Erich Pommer
1919 drama films
Silent drama films
1910s German films